Del Turco (or del Turco) may refer to:

 Rosselli del Turco, a historic noble family from Florence, Italy
 Del Turco (surname), Italian surname

Buildings 
 Palazzo Rosselli del Turco (Sassatelli branch), a historical palace located in Florence, Italy 
 Palazzo Borgherini-Rosselli del Turco, a Renaissance-style palace located in central Florence, Italy